Jennie-Lee Burmansson (born 12 July 2002) is a Swedish freestyle skier. She won a bronze medal in slopestyle at Winter X Games XXII. In 2018, Burmansson won the slopestyle World Cup and finished third in the overall World Cup standings.

World Cup results

Season titles
1 title (1 SS)

Season standings

Podiums
 1 win – (1 SS) 
 5 podiums – (5 SS)

World Championship results

Olympic results

References

External links

 
 
 
 
 

2002 births
Living people
X Games athletes
Swedish female freestyle skiers
Freestyle skiers at the 2018 Winter Olympics
Olympic freestyle skiers of Sweden
Freestyle skiers at the 2020 Winter Youth Olympics
Medalists at the 2020 Winter Youth Olympics